Boriboon Chanrueng (born December 19, 1979), better known as Tuk Boriboon, is a Thai actor, comedian, model and TV host. His high schools were Wannawit School and  Triam Udom Suksa Pattanakarn School. He earned a bachelor's degree in business administration at Suan Sunandha Rajabhat University.

Started an acting career at a young age, he entered the showbiz by starring in a fantasy dance film The Magic Shoes in 1992 (debut film of Prachya Pinkaew), as the younger brother of Touch (Touch Na Takuathung), the main character.

He later became best known for his moderator role in Khon Uad Phee, the television programme of Workpoint Entertainment. Chanrueng is married to Elsie Tan Ai Chia, a former Malaysian air hostess on July 28, 2013, at Grand Hyatt Erawan Bangkok.

Works

Dramatic programming appearances
 Ruen Ram
 Chom Phu Boek Fa
 Sanyan Luang
 Nang Saw Wan Chuen
 Nang Lakorn
 Big Sia
 Rong Ram Wi Prit
 Kalon X2
 Phalang Rak
 Saw Noi Roi Lan
 Suen Noi Noi Kalon Mak Noi
 Pluem
 Mai Dad
 Chom Phu Gam Mam
 Ngao Asok (2008)
 Nang Saw Yen Ruede (2008)
 Sukunka (2009)
 Phu Yai Lee and Nang Ma (2009)
 Cham Loei Gammathep (2009)
 Pee Sat San Kon (2010)
 Ghost Hotel (2010)
 Suai Rerd Cherd Sode (2010)
 365 days of Love (2010)
 Chuen Cheewa Naree (2011)
 Rak Airdate (2012)
 Ma Yai Tee Rak (2012)
 Kum Pha Kum (2012)
 Panya Chon Kon Khrua (2012)
 Wiwah Pacha Taek (2013)

Sitcoms appearances
 Yommalok Society
 Khu Kik Phrik Ka Kluea
 Ra Boed Thoed Thoeng Lan Thung (2010-2012)
 Sud Yod
 Ra Boed Taew Tiang Trong
 Wongkamlao The Series

Film appearances
 The Magic Shoes (1992)
 Fire & Ice (1996)
 Dek Sephle (1996)
 Ghost Variety (2005)
 Three Cripples (2007)
 Variety Ghost (2007)
 Village Of Warriors (2008)
 Se-Sing Confirm (2010)
 Teng Nong Jee Won Bin (2011)
 Hazard (2011)
 Jukkalan (2011)
 Still on My Mind (2011)
 Ghost Day (2012)
 Yak: The Giant King (2012)
 Saranae Osekkai (2012)
 Tho Sansang Thai Sangsan (2012)
 Grean Fictions (2013)
 Dinotherra (2013)

Music video appearances
 Thao Fai
 Thoe Mai Phit
 Nue Khu
 Rao Pen Khon Thai
 Leh
 Dek Pee Mee Chu
 Siang
 Rong Hai Ha Pho Thoe Rue

Television programming appearances
 You and I (1996)
 Q-twenty (2006)
 Ono Show (2010-2011)
 Khon Uad Phee (2010–present)
 Whose house? (2011–present)
 Suek Song Ban (2013–present)

Advertisement appearances
 Ziclet chewing gum
 Everscent Perfume cologne
 Mitsubishi Surprise
 Roller Coaster
 CP Chicken
 Fino
 Swensen's Happy Sundae

Concert
 Kote Cafe On Stage
 Train Rally Charity Concert
 Suptar ON STAGE
 Lift & Oil Happy Party Concert

Book
 Column Boriboon Family Magazine

References

External links
 

1979 births
Living people
Boriboon Chanrueng
Boriboon Chanrueng
Boriboon Chanrueng
Boriboon Chanrueng
Boriboon Chanrueng